The Pirate Party is a small political party in Tunisia which was formed on 7 April 2012. It is the second Pirate party in Tunisia after the Tunisian Pirate Party.

The party achieved notoriety during the Tunisian revolution. Slim Amamou briefly held a ministry, the world's first Pirate Party politician ever to do so, before resigning to protest against repressive measures by the interim government.

Party platform
On the Pirate Party's official website, it lists its main objectives as:
 preserving the right of every citizen of the absolute freedom of expression, communication, association and assembly
 representation of small investors to protect their companies from traces of intellectual property background
 devoted to a citizen's right to move freely around the world
 direct democracy and the inclusion of digital technology in this area support
 bringing an end to control of the Internet
 dedicated to the neutrality of the Internet
 protecting the freedom of information and independence of investigative journalism
 unconditional and free access to information
 working on the principle of absolute transparency of the government and the public sector
 open government
 promoting alternative systems of copyright and intellectual property
 anti-censorship of all kinds
 defending the rights and freedoms of the individual and the collective, especially with regard to digital freedoms
 use of free software in public institutions in order to adapt to the era of digital technology at the lowest cost and highest performance
 promoting open digital standards
 combating forms of digital monopoly and confront the downsides of proprietary software and the dominance of one party in the market
 elimination of legal obstacles that hinder the right of the media and particularly the media networks, community and non-profit Free

References

External links
 

2012 establishments in Tunisia
Liberal parties in Tunisia
Tunisia
Political parties established in 2012
Political parties in Tunisia
Secularism in Tunisia